Miles Ronald Cole Hewstone (born 4 August 1956) is a British social psychologist who is well known for his work on social relations.

Biography
He graduated from the University of Bristol in 1978 and then moved to the University of Oxford from which he obtained a D.Phil. in social psychology in 1981. He pursued post-doctoral work at the University of Tübingen, Germany from which he obtained a Habilitation in 1986. He then undertook further work  with Serge Moscovici (in Paris) and Wolfgang Stroebe (in Tübingen).

He held chairs in social psychology at the University of Bristol, University of Mannheim, Germany, and Cardiff University before taking up a chair at the University of Oxford where he was also a Fellow of New College.  He has been a Fellow at the Center for Advanced Study in the Behavioral Sciences, Stanford University.

Work
He has published widely in the field of experimental social psychology. His major topics of research have been: attribution theory, social cognition, social influence, stereotyping and intergroup relations, and intergroup conflict. His current work centres on the reduction of intergroup conflict, via intergroup contact, stereotype change and crossed categorization.

He is a former editor of the British Journal of Social Psychology, and co-founding editor of the European Review of Social Psychology.

Awards
 1987 - British Psychological Society’s Spearman Medal 
 2001 - British Psychological Society, Presidents’ Award for Distinguished Contributions to Psychological Knowledge
 Fellow of the British Psychological Society
 Fellow of the Society for Personality and Social Psychology
 Fellow of the Society for the Psychological Study of Social Issues
 Fellow of the British Academy
 Fellow of the  Academy of Learned Societies for the Social Sciences
 2003 - Honorary Fellow of the British Psychological Society.

Books
 Understanding attitudes to the European Community:  A social psychological study in four member states (Cambridge University Press)
 Causal attribution: From cognitive processes to collective beliefs (Blackwell, 1989)
 Contact and conflict in intergroup encounters (edited with R. Brown; Blackwell, 1986)
 The Blackwell encyclopedia of social psychology (edited with A.S.R. Manstead, 1995; Blackwell)
 Stereotypes and stereotyping (edited with C.N. Macrae and C. Stangor; Guilford, 1996).

 Multiple social categorization: Processes, models, and applications (edited with R. Crisp; Psychology Press, 2006)

Book chapters
 Measures of intergroup contact. In Boyle, Gregory J.; Saklofske, Donald H.; Matthews, Gerald (2015). Measures of Personality and Social Psychological Constructs. San Diego: Academic Press. .

References

1956 births
Living people
Alumni of the University of Bristol
Alumni of Trinity College, Oxford
University of Tübingen alumni
Academics of Cardiff University
Academics of the University of Bristol
British psychologists
Social psychologists
Fellows of New College, Oxford
Fellows of the British Academy
Center for Advanced Study in the Behavioral Sciences fellows
Academic staff of the University of Mannheim